Jena Irene Asciutto (born July 13, 1996), also known as Jena Irene, is an American singer from Farmington Hills, Michigan. She was the runner-up of the 13th season of American Idol. Asciutto became the first female Wild Card contestant of the series to qualify into the finale and became the second Wild Card contestant, after Clay Aiken in the second season, to make it into the finale. In April 2015, she signed a long-term recording deal with the independent Detroit label Original 1265 Recordings. Asciutto released her debut EP, Innocence, on April 22, 2016, which was followed by her debut album, Cold Fame.

Early life
Jena Irene Asciutto was born in Farmington Hills, Michigan, on July 13, 1996, to George Asciutto and Julie (née Loiselle). She graduated from North Farmington High School on June 8, 2014. She participated in North Farmington's annual "Coffee House" talent show, and from ages 12–16 was a member of a band called Infinity Hour, before it disbanded in February 2013, prior to her American Idol audition.

Career

2014-present: American Idol, Innocence, and Cold Fame
While on American Idol, she performed under the shortened name of Jena Irene. For her American Idol audition, Asciutto sang "Rolling in the Deep" by Adele. During the audition process, production continually called her "Jena Irene," possibly due to a mistake she made when writing down her name, as "Irene" is not her surname, but rather her middle name. Although she initially made attempts to correct her name, she eventually decided to keep the name professionally.

During the group round, she sang "Too Close" by Alex Clare, alongside Sikenya Thomson, Allie Odom, and Mufarid Zaidi. She made it into the third part of Hollywood week by singing an original song called "Unbreakable Me," which has since been released on iTunes. Asciutto performed the song again during her hometown visit after making it to the top 3. She was announced as the runner-up on May 21, 2014.

Performances on American Idol

Asciutto took part in the American Idols Live! Tour 2014 from June 24 through August 24, 2014. She began work on her debut album immediately after the show as well.

In April 2015, Asciutto signed a record deal with Detroit-based label Original 1265 Records. In October 2015, the music video for "Unbreakable" was released. The single would later be on both debut EP, Innocence, which was released on April 22, 2016, and her album, Cold Fame, was released in late 2016. The music video for the second single, "Innocence", was released on April 20, 2016. On April 22, 2016, "You Gotta Help Me", was featured in the Billboard.com Editors' Picks.

Discography

Extended plays

Singles

Releases from "American Idol"
"Clarity"
"Bring Me to Life"
"Rolling in the Deep"
"I Love Rock 'n' Roll"
"Creep"
"Barracuda"
"My Body"
"Heartbreaker"

Music videos

References

External links
 Irena Jena Irena on American Idol
 

American Idol participants
Living people
1996 births
American pop rock singers
Alternative rock singers
Singer-songwriters from Michigan
American women singer-songwriters
People from Oakland County, Michigan
21st-century American women singers
North Farmington High School alumni